X-Men: The 198 is a comic book limited series that was published by Marvel Comics and set in the Marvel Universe shortly after the House of M and Decimation events.  The five-issue series began publication in January 2006.

The series focuses on the supporting cast of the X-Men, whose ranks have been severely depleted following Decimation.

Plot
In House of M #7, the Scarlet Witch removes the powers of the overwhelming majority of the world's mutants in an event, eventually called "M-Day". As a reaction, the United States government forms a superhuman-monitoring Office of National Emergency (ONE), and sets up a team of human-piloted Sentinel robots (Sentinel Squad ONE) to monitor the Xavier Institute.  X-Men: The 198 revolves around the tension and conflicts of the 198 mutant refugees on the Xavier Institute grounds and the Sentinel Squad ONE. Tensions also rise between X-Men.

Xavier's Mansion Mutant Sanctuary
After the events of Decimation, many of the remaining mutants sought refuge at the Xavier Institute. Due to the suggestion of Erg, they are referred to as  The 198.  These include the following:

The list excludes Xavier Institute staff members and the remaining student body as well as the Sentinel Squad O*N*E.

The 198 Files
The 198 Files is a database maintained by O*N*E that attempts to classify and provide intelligence on the mutants whose powers remained after M-Day. The one-shot X-Men: The 198 Files is set in the style of a government dossier and sent to O*N*E's deputy director Valerie Cooper. It provides the classification of 134 of the 198 mutants supposedly unaffected by M-Day and was released in January 2006 as a counterpart to the five-part limited series The 198 which shows the conflict of the remaining mutants seeking refuge at the Xavier Institute, and the Sentinel Squad O*N*E.

Bibliography
X-Men: The 198 Files (January 2006)
X-Men: The 198 #1-5 (January–May 2006)

2006 comics debuts